Club Omnisport de La Police Nationale, commonly known as COSPN or COSPN Analamanga, is a Malagasy basketball club based in Antananarivo, Analamanga. The team plays in the N1A, the top tier level in Madagascar. The team has won the league two times, in 2018 and 2021.

In December 2018, COSPN qualified for the 2018–19 Africa Basketball League after defeating Premium Cobras from the Seychelles in the Zone 7 qualification. It was the COSPN's debut at Africa's highest continental level.

Honours
Malagasy N1A
Winners (2): 2018, 2021
Runners-up (2): 2016, 2019

 FIBA Africa Zone 7 Championship
 Champions: 2017

In African competitions
FIBA Africa Basketball League  (1 appearances)
2018–19 – Group Stage

Road to BAL (1 appearance)
2023 – In progress

Players

2022 roster

References

Basketball teams in Madagascar

Road to BAL teams